Eğri Eyalet or Pashaluk of Eğri was an administrative territorial entity of the Ottoman Empire formed in 1596 with its capital at Eğri (Hungarian: Eger). It included parts of present-day Hungary and Slovakia.

The population of the province was ethnically and religiously diverse and included Slovaks and Hungarians (living mainly in the north), Serbs (living mainly in the south), and Muslims of various ethnic origins (living mainly in the cities). Other ethnic communities included Jews and Romani.

Administrative divisions
The province included the following sanjaks:
 Sanjak of Eğri (Eger)
 Sanjak of Segedin (Szeged)
 Sanjak of Sonluk (Szolnok)
 Sanjak of Seçen (Szécsény)
 Sanjak of Hatvan (Hatvan)
 Sanjak of Novigrad (Nograd)
 Sanjak of Filek (Filakovo) (Its center was Rim Sonbat)

References

Dr. Dušan J. Popović, Srbi u Vojvodini, knjiga 1, Novi Sad, 1990.

See also
 Long War (Ottoman wars)
 Ottoman Hungary
 History of Ottoman Serbia

Ottoman period in Hungary
Ottoman period in Slovakia
Ottoman Serbia
Ottoman history of Vojvodina
Eyalets of the Ottoman Empire in Europe
States and territories established in 1596
1596 establishments in the Ottoman Empire
1687 disestablishments in the Ottoman Empire